Events from the year 1132 in Ireland.

Incumbents
High King of Ireland: Toirdelbach Ua Conchobair

Events
Summer – Conchobhair O Brian of Thomond makes a marauding raid on Uí Maine and besieges Galway.
Malachy, Bishop of Down and of Connor, is appointed Archbishop of Armagh.

Births

Deaths
Conchobhar Ua Flaithbheartaigh, king of Iar Connacht.

References